Under Orders is a novel by Dick Francis,  published on 7 September 2006.

This is the fourth Francis novel to feature Sid Halley, jockey turned private detective.

The title is a reference to the time shortly before the start of the race, when the horses and jockeys must obey the orders of the starter.

References

External links
 The Guardian

2006 British novels
Novels by Dick Francis
Horse racing novels
British sports novels
British crime novels
Michael Joseph books